The Diocesan Museum of Milan (Museo Diocesano di Milano in Italian) is an art museum in Milan housing a permanent collection of sacred artworks, especially from Milan and Lombardy.
Originally conceived by Ildefonso Schuster in 1931 as a vehicle to protect and promote the art collection of the Archdiocese of Milan, the museum was eventually established in the former headquarters of the Dominican Order in the back of the Basilica of Sant'Eustorgio with the support of Pope Paul VI. In 2001 Carlo Maria Martini inaugurated the current venue located in Porta Ticinese.

Bibliography
Milano e Provincia, Touring Club italiano, ed.2003, autori vari

See also 
 Diocesan museum

References

External links
Museodiocesano.it

Art museums and galleries in Milan
Milan
Art museums established in 2001
Museo Diocesano
Tourist attractions in Milan